Ylay-Talaa is a village in Kara-Kulja District of Osh Region of Kyrgyzstan. Its population was 7,356 in 2021.

Population

References

Populated places in Osh Region